Bongani Msomi is a South African politician and the current secretary general of the UDM, a political party founded by South African politician Bantu Holomisa.

References

Living people
South African politicians
Year of birth missing (living people)
Place of birth missing (living people)